Naucleopsis oblongifolia is a species of plant in the family Moraceae. It is native to South America.

References

Flora of Brazil
oblongifolia
Vulnerable plants
Taxonomy articles created by Polbot